Band 4.1-like protein 2 is a protein that in humans is encoded by the EPB41L2 gene.

Interactions 

EPB41L2 has been shown to interact with FKBP2 and GRIA1.

References

Further reading